The 2019 LPGA Tour was a series of professional golf tournaments for elite female golfers from around the world. The season began at the Four Season Golf Club in Lake Buena Vista, Florida on January 17 and ended on November 24 at the Tiburón Golf Club in Naples, Florida. The tournaments are sanctioned by the United States-based Ladies Professional Golf Association (LPGA).

Schedule and results
The number in parentheses after each winners' name is the player's total number of wins in official money individual events on the LPGA Tour, including that event. Tournament and winner names in bold indicate LPGA majors.

Key

Statistical information
Key

Wins by player

Wins by nation

Points leaders

Rolex Player of the Year
Points distribution
Points were earned based on top-10 finishers, available points for regular events were as follows: 

Points are doubled at each of the LPGA's five major championships.

Source and complete list: LPGA official website.

Race to CME Globe

Source and complete list: LPGA official website.

Rolex First-Time Winners

Statistics leaders

Money list leaders

Source and complete list: LPGA official website.

Scoring average

Source and complete list: LPGA official website.

Awards

See also
2019 Ladies European Tour
2019 Symetra Tour

References

LPGA Tour seasons
LPGA Tour